Szczepanik is a Polish surname, it may refer to:
 Edward Szczepanik (1915–2005), Polish economist
 Grzegorz Szczepanik (born 1953), Polish speedway racer
 Jan Szczepanik (1872–1926), Polish inventor
 Piotr Szczepanik (born 1942), Polish singer

Surnames of Polish origin